Acting Dead is an American satirical dark comedy about the world of Hollywood zombies. The series focuses on Tate Blodgett (Brian Beacock), a zombie, and Alex Carbonneux (Jillian Clare), a ghost, as they both struggle with their new afterlife.

Episodes 
 Episode 1: Career Suicide
 Episode 2: Throw The Switch!
 Episode 3: Polterguise
 Episode 4: Talent and Brains
 Episode 5: The "X" Is Silent But Deadly
 Episode 6: This Town Needs an Exorcist
 Episode 7: Take You Out for a Bite
 Episode 8: Money Back Scarentee

Cast and characters

Main cast 
 Brian Beacok as Tate Blodgett
 Jillian Clare as Alex Carbonneux
 Chris Galya as Hunter Lee
 Patrika Darbo as Margot Mullen, Tate's agent.
 Paul Nygro as Paul Baker
 John Yelvington as Maddox Shane

Guest stars 
 Debbie Gibson as Roberta
 Sheila Korsi as Rosalia
 Lori Alan as Zombietologist
 Carolyn Hennesy as Dr. Ivana Wurshter
 Christine Lakin as Snotty Casting Director
 Eric Martsolf as Lab Assistant
 John J. York as Tennyson Albright
 Cocoa Brown as Scared Casting Director
 Peter Allen Vogt as Xavier LeBeaux

Awards 

Austin Indie Flix Showcase, 2014

Austin WebFest, 2015

Brooklyn WebFest, 2015

FilmQuest, US, 2015

IFQ, 2015

Independent Film Quarterly Film and Webisode Festival, 2014

Indie Series Awards, 2015

Long Beach Comic Con, 2015

Los Angeles Independent Film Festival Awards, 2015

New York Comic Con, 2015

Primetime Emmy Awards, 2016

Raindance Film Festival, 2014

References

External links

American comedy web series
Zombies in television
2014 web series debuts
Zombie web series
Satirical web series
American satirical websites
2014 web series endings